Ramularia subtilis is a fungus.

References

subtilis
Fungal plant pathogens and diseases
Fungi described in 2006